Club Deportivo Real Sociedad, commonly known as Real Sociedad, is a Honduran football club based on Tocoa, Colón, Honduras.

History
Real Sociedad reached the Liga Nacional de Ascenso (the Honduran second flight) in 1988, and played there until the 2011–2012 season.  Their success in that season saw them earn promotion to the top flight.  In their first season, the 2012 Apertura (first season), they finished dead last and were in serious danger of instant relegation.  The team's board of directors began replenishing the team with a host of signings.  First came Julio César de León, an attacking midfielder and free kick specialist then playing in Italy.  Next came midfielder Elkin González, forward Juan Cárcamo, and keeper Sandro Carcamo.  All these players were on the older side, but their experience steeled the team.  They then secured young striker Rony Martínez on loan and played him alongside quick center forward Diego Reyes.  Suddenly, Real Sociedad was a team to be reckoned with.

The clausura tournament saw the Tocoeños surge to the opposite end of the table.  Not only were they well clear of relegation, they finished second and earned an automatic berth in the Clausura semi-finals.  There, they beat 5–2 on aggregate and earned the right to face Olimpia in the championship finals.  No Honduran club has been quite as successful as Olimpia, but Real Sociedad took them to the limit, winning the first leg of the tie 1–0.  It wasn't enough, as Olimpia ultimately prevailed 2–1, but Real Sociedad had secured themselves in the top flight.

The suddenly well-stocked team continued to compete, finishing top of the table in the 2013 Apertura regular season.  They reached the finals again, only to lose on penalties to Real España.  They also qualified for the 2014 Clausura playoffs, losing in the semi-finals.  Overall, Real Sociedad's 17 wins in 36 matches made them the most successful team in the 2013–2014 season (although they did not win any championships.

Over the next several years, Sociedad was a regular playoff participant and reached the finals in both the 2014 Apertura and 2016 Clausura.  However, the 2017–2018 season saw their form collapse.  They finished 7th in the Apertura and dead last in the Clausura.  A late season surge by Honduras Progreso doomed them to relegation, ending their first stint in the top flight.

Achievements
Real Sociedad qualified to their first final just after one year of being promoted into the first division. They defeated Victoria 5–2 aggregate and later faced Olimpia, giving Colón its first final in history.

Liga Nacional
Runners-up (4): 2012–13 C, 2013–14 A, 2014–15 A, 2015–16 C

Segunda División / Liga de Ascenso
Winners (2): 2011–12 A, 2018–19 A
Runners-up (3): 1997–98, 2010–11 C, 2011–12 C

Domestic history

List of coaches
  Raúl Martínez Sambulá (2012 – Nov 12)
  Jairo Ríos (Jan 2013 – May 13)
  Héctor Castellón (June 2013–1?)
  Mauro Reyes (201?–Sept 14)
  Horacio Londoño (2014-2015)
  Mauro Reyes (2015-2016)
  Mauro Reyes (2015-2016)
  Marvin Solano (2016)
  Douglas Munguía (2016)
  Carlos Martínez (2016-2017)
  Héctor "Figura" Medina (2017)
  Carlos Martínez (2017)
  Douglas Munguía (2017-2018)
  Santiago Fúnez (2018)
  David Fúnez (2018)
  José Maley (2018)
  Horacio Londoño (2019)
  Carlos Martínez (2019)
  Mauro Reyes (2019)
  Carlos Tábora (2019-2020)
  Mauro Reyes (2020)
  Carlos Martínez (2020)
  Adrián García Padilla (2020)
  Carlos Tábora (2020-February 2022)
  Orlando Restrepo (February 2022 - Present)

References

 
Colón Department (Honduras)
Football clubs in Honduras
Association football clubs established in 1986
1986 establishments in Honduras